Aliabad (also Romanized as ‘Alīābād) is a village in Montazeriyeh Rural District, in the Central District of Tabas County, South Khorasan Province, Iran. At the 2006 census, its population was 21, in 6 families.

References 

Populated places in Tabas County